Bauerago is a genus of fungi found in the family Microbotryaceae. It contained 9 species before being reduced to 5 species.

The genus name of Bauerago is in honour of Robert Bauer (1950–2014), who was a German mycologist, specialising in rust (Uredinales) and smut (Ustilaginomycetes) fungi. 

The genus was circumscribed by Kálmán Géza Vánky in Mycotaxon vol.70 on pages 44 and 46 in 1999.

Species
As accepted by Species Fungorum;
 Bauerago abstrusa 
 Bauerago capensis 
 Bauerago cyperi-lucidi 
 Bauerago gardneri 
 Bauerago vuyckii 

Former species;
 B. boliviana  = Kalmanago boliviana 
 B. combensis  = Kalmanago combensis
 B. commelinae  = Kalmanago commelinae
 B. tinantiae  = Kalmanago tinantiae

References

External links

Basidiomycota genera
Microbotryales